Forest is the seventh album of pianist George Winston and his sixth solo piano album, released in 1994. It was reissued on Dancing Cat Records in 2008. The album won the 1996 Grammy Award for Best New Age Album. The album was certified Gold by the RIAA on December 21, 1994.
 
The track "Japanese Music Box (Itsuki No Komoriuta)" is based on a traditional Japanese lullaby  "Itsuki Lullaby" that comes from Itsuki in southern Japan.

Track listing

Charts

References

External links
 Liner notes

1994 albums
George Winston albums
Grammy Award for Best New Age Album
New-age albums by American artists
Dancing Cat Records albums
Windham Hill Records albums